Mark A H Buckingham (born 10 November 1964) is a male retired British rower. Buckingham competed in the men's coxless four event at the 1988 Summer Olympics. He represented England and won a silver medal in the eight, at the 1986 Commonwealth Games in Edinburgh, Scotland.

References

External links
 

1964 births
Living people
British male rowers
Olympic rowers of Great Britain
Rowers at the 1988 Summer Olympics
Sportspeople from Wallsend
Commonwealth Games medallists in rowing
Commonwealth Games silver medallists for England
Rowers at the 1986 Commonwealth Games
Medallists at the 1986 Commonwealth Games